The County of Pelham is a county (a cadastral division) in Queensland, Australia, located in the Shire of Banana in Central Queensland.  The county is divided into civil  parishes. The county was created on 1 September 1855 by royal proclamation under the Waste Lands Australia Act 1846. On 7 March 1901, the Governor issued a proclamation legally dividing Queensland into counties under the Land Act 1897. Its schedule described Pelham thus:

Parishes 
Pelham is divided into parishes, as listed below:

References

Pelham

External links